Wheatley Windmill is an 18th-century tower mill at  between the hamlet of Littleworth and Wheatley in Oxfordshire, England. The windmill has an octagonal plan which narrows to form the circular rotating cap.

History 
The first written evidence concerning the mill is dated 1671, describing it as being "in a ruinous condition" even then. In 1760, there was significant fire and wind damage. New machinery was installed in 1784, supplied by the Eagle Ironworks in Oxford. After 1914, the mill fell into disuse and disrepair. However, the Wheatley Windmill Restoration Society has been restoring the windmill since 1977 and it is currently open to the public.

The Mill Building 
The octagonal shape of this 18th-century tower mill is distinctly unusual; there are only two or three such towers in the UK. The tower has three storeys. There are two fireplaces on the ground floor (some mills only had one, and others none at all) and a properly framed staircase leads to the 'stone floor', i.e. the first floor, where the mill stones are set. The original curved dome cap was copper clad and has been described as being 'picturesque without being elegant'.
There were originally four sails (which turned clockwise rather than the more usual anti-clock) but for a time the windmill operated on two sails only. These were of the 'common' type with a wooden frame rigged with canvas which could be set according to the state of the wind and the amount of work the miller had to do. The canvas used was similar to that used on Thames barges.

See also 
 List of windmills in Oxfordshire

References

External links 
 Wheatley Windmill - Official Website
 Oxford Preservation Trust Award for Building Conservation 2010

Windmills in Oxfordshire